Bertuccelli is an Italian surname. Notable people with the surname include:

Alberto Bertuccelli (1924–2002), Italian footballer
Jean-Louis Bertuccelli (1942–2014), French film director and screenwriter
Valeria Bertuccelli (born 1969), Argentine actress

Italian-language surnames